Anna Maria Barabino (born 17 November 1966) is an Italian yacht racer who competed in the 1992 Summer Olympics as helmsmen in the 470 class.

References

External links
 
 
 

1966 births
Living people
Italian female sailors (sport)
Olympic sailors of Italy
Sailors at the 1992 Summer Olympics – 470